The Fifth Ward Meetinghouse in Salt Lake City, Utah was built in 1910.  It was designed by architects Cannon & Fetzer.  It was listed on the National Register of Historic Places in 1978.  The building was constructed to be and functioned as meetinghouse for the Church of Jesus Christ of Latter-day Saints until 1975.  Since then it has housed a variety of functions and currently is a Urgyen Samten Ling Gonpa Tibetan temple on the main floor and the Red Lotus School of Movement in the basement.

References

20th-century Latter Day Saint church buildings
Former churches in Utah
Former Latter Day Saint religious buildings and structures
Gothic Revival church buildings in Utah
Meetinghouses of the Church of Jesus Christ of Latter-day Saints in Utah
Churches on the National Register of Historic Places in Utah
Religious buildings and structures in Salt Lake City
Churches completed in 1910
National Register of Historic Places in Salt Lake City